Sir Owen St Clair O'Malley  (4 May 1887 – 16 April 1974) was a British diplomat. He was Minister to Hungary between 1939 and 1941. He was British ambassador to the Polish government in exile in London during World War II. From July 1945 until May 1947, he was Ambassador to Portugal.

Background and education
O'Malley was born in Eastbourne, the son of Sir Edward Loughlin O'Malley. He was educated at Rugby School, Radley College and Magdalen College at the University of Oxford.

Diplomatic career
O'Malley entered the Foreign Office in 1911. During World War II, serving as British Ambassador to Yugoslavia in 1941, O'Malley helped British secret agents Andrzej Kowerski and Krystyna Skarbek escape eastern Europe as German forces were advancing. He was appointed ambassador to the Polish government-in-exile in February 1943. He is particularly noted for his incisive report sent on 24 May 1943 to the Foreign Secretary, Anthony Eden, on the Katyn Massacre indicating the likelihood of Soviet guilt and the moral issues raised.

Besides his report on Katyn, O'Malley was also critical of Churchill's role in acceding to Stalin in Stalin's demands regarding the frontiers of Polish territory after the war. O'Malley raised questions about the British government's complicity in the annexation of another country's territory and whether "the basis of international law is to be law or an exhibition of power politics".

He was appointed a CMG in 1927 and a KCMG in 1947.

Personal life
In 1913, on holiday in Scotland, O'Malley met Mary Ann Dolling Sanders (1889–1974), who later became a novelist using the pseudonym of Ann Bridge. They were married on 25 October 1913 and had two daughters and a son.

Sir Owen O'Malley died on 16 April 1974 at 27 Charlbury Road, Oxford, five weeks after the death of his wife.

Bibliography
 Cloud, Stanley and Olson, Lynne, A Question of Honor, pg. 304, Vintage Books.
 Rees, Laurence, World War II: Behind Closed Doors — Stalin, The Nazis and the West, BBC Books, 2008, page 186.
 Mulloy, Shelia, O'Malley: People and Places, Ballinakella Press, 1986.
 West, Diana, American Betrayal, pp: 204-205, St. Martin's Press, 2013.

References

External links
O'Malley, Sir Owen St Clair in the Oxford Dictionary of National Biography
Despatch from Sir Owen O’Malley, 24 May 1943
Images of Sir Owen St Clair O'Malley in the National Portrait Gallery (London)

1887 births
1974 deaths
People from Eastbourne
British people of Irish descent
People educated at Rugby School
People educated at Radley College
Alumni of Magdalen College, Oxford
Ambassadors of the United Kingdom to Poland
Ambassadors of the United Kingdom to Hungary
Ambassadors of the United Kingdom to Portugal
Knights Commander of the Order of St Michael and St George
Katyn massacre investigators